2022 in Korea may refer to:
2022 in North Korea
2022 in South Korea